EPRO may refer to:

ePRO, or Electronic patient-reported outcome
EPRO, or Extreme Risk Protection Order